How to Seduce Your Teacher is a 1979 commedia sexy all'italiana directed by Mariano Laurenti. It is the third instalment in the "Liceale" film series and was followed by La liceale, il diavolo e l'acquasanta. Gloria Guida is also performer of two songs of the soundtrack, "Come vuoi... con chi vuoi" and "Stammi vicino".

Cast
 Gloria Guida as Angela Mancinelli
 Lino Banfi as Professor Pasquale La Recchiuta
 Carletto Sposito as Professor Caccioppo
 Alvaro Vitali as Salvatore Pinzarrone
 Ninetto Davoli as Arturo 
 Lorraine De Selle as Fedora
 Donatella Damiani as Irma

Related films
La liceale (1975)   

La liceale nella classe dei ripetenti (1978) 
  
La liceale, il diavolo e l'acquasanta (1979), anthology film 
La liceale al mare con l'amica di papà (1980), without Gloria Guida

References

External links
 

1979 films
1979 comedy films
1970s high school films
1970s sex comedy films
Commedia sexy all'italiana
Films directed by Mariano Laurenti
Films scored by Gianni Ferrio
Films set in Apulia
Films shot in Apulia
Italian high school films
Liceale films
Teen sex comedy films
1970s Italian films